The ALCO RSD-15 is a diesel-electric locomotive built by the American Locomotive Company (ALCO) of Schenectady, New York between August 1956 and June 1960, during which time 75 locomotives were produced.

The locomotive rode on a pair of three-axle Trimount trucks with all axles powered by General Electric model 752 traction motors. These trucks have an asymmetrical axle spacing because of the positioning of the traction motors. The six-motor design allowed higher tractive effort at lower speeds than an otherwise similar four-motor design.

The RSD-15 could be ordered with either a high or low short hood; railfans dubbed the low short hood version "Alligators", due to their unusually long low noses.

RSD-17
A single example of the very similar model RSD-17 was built by the Montreal Locomotive Works in 1957. After demonstrating on the Canadian Pacific (as #7007), the Canadian National (as #3899), and the Pacific Great Eastern (as #624), the locomotive was purchased by the Canadian Pacific (as #8921). Nicknamed "The Empress of Agincourt", by Pete Fairfull, who was its primary operator for many years, (for its common presence around Toronto's Agincourt yard), the locomotive served the railway until 1995, when truck problems forced its retirement.

Original owners

Surviving examples

Six RSD-15s survive in preservation; all are ex-Santa Fe units.
Only two are in operating condition; the Austin and Texas Central #442, originally ATSF 842, painted in a modified Southern Pacific "Black Widow" scheme,
and Green Bay and Western Railroad RSD-15 #2407 (originally ATSF 841) at the Illinois Railway Museum.
Others that are preserved are Santa Fe 823, in second owner Utah Railway colors at the Utah Railroad Museum, the California State Railroad Museum in Sacramento has one (Santa Fe #9820) and the Arkansas Railroad Museum has Santa Fe #843.

The RSD-17 demonstrator, Canadian Pacific 8921, is preserved at the Elgin County Railway Museum, St. Thomas, Ontario, Canada.

Models
The RSD-15 has been produced in N scale by Mehano of Yugoslavia and Broadway Limited of the United States.

The RSD-15 has been produced in HO scale by Broadway Limited Imports and handmade brass. Alco Models (DL600b) high and Low hoods. Also (Overland Models).

The RSD-15 has been produced in O scale by Atlas O in their Trainman line.

The RSD-17 has not been mass-produced in any scale; however, in 2008 Broadway Limited Imports did produce a limited run of the high-hood CP 8921 in HO scale.

See also
 List of Alco diesel locomotives
 List of MLW diesel locomotives

References

External links
 

C-C locomotives
RSD-15
Railway locomotives introduced in 1956
Diesel-electric locomotives of the United States
Freight locomotives
Standard gauge locomotives of Canada
Standard gauge locomotives of the United States